Animal fats and oils are lipids derived from animals: oils are liquid at room temperature, and fats are solid.  Chemically, both fats and oils are composed of triglycerides. Although many animal parts and secretions may yield oil, in commercial practice, oil is extracted primarily from rendered tissue fats from livestock animals like pigs, chickens and cows. Dairy products yield animal fat and oil products such as butter. 

Certain fats, such as goose fat, have a higher smoke point than other animal fats, but are still lower than many vegetable oils such as olive or avocado.

Animal fats are commonly consumed as part of a western diet in their semi-solid form as either milk, butter, lard, schmaltz, and dripping or more commonly as filler in factory produced meat, pet food and fast-food products.

Culinary uses 

Many animal fats and oils are consumed directly, or indirectly as ingredients in food. The oils serve a number of purposes in this role:
  Shortening – to give pastry a crumbly texture.
 Texture – oils can serve to make other ingredients stick together less.
 Flavor – some may be chosen specifically for the flavor they impart.
 Flavor base – oils can also "carry" flavors of other ingredients, since many flavors are present in chemicals that are soluble in oil.

Secondly, oils can be heated, and used to cook foods. Oils suitable for this purpose must have a high flash point.

See also 
Vegetable fats and oils
Kitchen rendering
Liquid
Triglyceride
Suet
Tallow
Ghee

References 

Animal fats